Cookhill Priory was a Cistercian nunnery near Cookhill in Worcestershire, England.

History

The Priory is believed to be founded by Isabel de Mauduit, wife of William de Beauchamp, 9th Earl of Warwick in 1260, but it most likely dates to some years before then. It is on record that she was buried at Cookhill when she died, and that she had become a nun there by the time of his death in 1298. A tomb with a broken dedication was still present in the chapel in seventeenth century.

The Priory was noted for its poverty and repeatedly exempted from taxation. Volume 2 of the History of the County of Worcester says:
The poverty of the house of Cookhill is indeed almost the chief feature of its known history. Almost every reference to the nuns is to speak of their poverty, to exempt them with other slenderly endowed houses from payment of any extraordinary taxation or to grant them respite for the arrears already owing to the king.
The numbers of nuns present was small, probably around seven, as at the time of dissolution. The Priory was dissolved in 1540, two or three years later than most, and the nuns given pensions.

It is now a Grade II* listed building and occupied by a recording studio, VADA Studios.

In February 2008, it was filmed for the 2008 British horror film The Children.

Burials
Isabel de Mauduit, wife of William (III) de Beauchamp

Tax dispute
The tax status of the property at its sale in 2001 after the death of Mrs Rosemary Antrobus made for two legal cases, known as Antrobus I and Antrobus II. These have influenced the current understanding of the definition of farm properties for agricultural property relief. HMRC agreed that the property was a farmhouse, but that it was not entitled to be viewed as a solely agricultural building.

References

Sources
 
 
 

Monasteries in Warwickshire
Monasteries in Worcestershire
Grade II* listed buildings in Worcestershire
Cistercian nunneries in England
1260 establishments in England
Christian monasteries established in the 13th century